is one of the 18 wards of the city of Yokohama in Kanagawa Prefecture, Japan. As of 2010, the ward had an estimated population of 199,258 and a density of 7,130 persons per km². The total area was 27.93 km².

Geography
Tsuzuki Ward is located in eastern Kanagawa Prefecture, and north of the geographic center of the city of Yokohama.

Surrounding municipalities
Kōhoku Ward
Midori Ward
Aoba Ward

History
The area around present-day Tsuzuki Ward was formerly part of Tsutsuki District in Musashi Province. During the Edo period, it was a rural region classified as tenryō territory controlled directly by the Tokugawa shogunate, but administered through various hatamoto.  After the Meiji Restoration, the area became part of the new Kanagawa Prefecture. In the cadastral reform of April 1, 1889, the area was divided into numerous villages. In April 1939, the area was annexed by the neighboring city of Yokohama, becoming part of Kōhoku Ward. In a major administrative reorganization of October 1, 1969, Kōhoku was divided, with parts of the present-day area of Tsuzuki becoming part of the new Midori-ku.  On November 6, 1994, Kōhoku and Midori were recombined, and then re-divided into four Wards (Kōhoku, Midori, Tsuzuki and Aoba).  The division and re-division of Wards has much to do with the development of northern Yokohama by railroad companies.  The opening of the Tōkyū Den-en-toshi Line and associated  residential communities led to the rapid suburban development in this region. This was followed by the  project in the 1980s and early 1990s. The core of the Kōhoku New Town became a significant commercial centre once the subway line extension between Shin-Yokohama and Azamino was completed in 1993.  The influx of new population resulted in the entire “Kōhoku New Town” being re-organized into the new Tsuzuki Ward.

Economy
Tsuzuki Ward is primarily a regional commercial center and bedroom community for central Yokohama, Kawasaki and Tokyo. There is some light manufacturing and residual agriculture. Prior to World War II, the area was known for its production of chrysanthemums. Car Make T&E and Weld X Overdose Techniques Factory are headquartered in Tsuzuki Ward.

Transportation

Railroads
Yokohama City Transportation Bureau – Blue Line
  –  –  – 
Yokohama City Transportation Bureau – Green Line
  -  -  -  -  -

Highways
Daisan Keihin
Japan National Route 246

Education

Kanagawa Prefectural Board of Education operates public high schools. Public high schools:
Kawawa High School

 operates public elementary and junior high schools.

Public junior high schools:

Chigasaki (茅ケ崎)
Edaminami (荏田南)
Hayabuchi (早渕)
Higashi-yamata (東山田)
Kawawa (川和)
Nakagawa (中川)
Nakagawa-nishi (中川西)
Tsuda (都田)

Public elementary schools:

Chigasaki (茅ケ崎)
Chigasakidai (茅ケ崎台)
Chigasaki-higashi (茅ケ崎東)
Eda (荏田)
Edahigashi-Dai-ichi (荏田東第一)
Edaminami (荏田南)
Higashi-yamata (東山田)
Kachida (勝田)
Kawawa (川和)
Kawawa-higashi (川和東)
Kita-yamata (北山田)
Minami-yamata (南山田)
Nakagawa (中川)
Nakagawa-nishi (中川西)
Orimoto (折本)
Sumiregaoka (すみれが丘)
Tsuda (都田)
Tsuda-nishi (都田西)
Tsuzuki (都筑)
Tsuzuki-no-oka (つづきの丘)
Ushikubo (牛久保)
Yamata (山田)

Additionally, Higashiichigao Elementary (ケ尾小学校), Kamoi Elementary (鴨居小学校), and Shinyoshida Daini Elementary (新吉田第二小学校), which have their campuses outside of Tsuzuki-ku, have zones that include portions of Tsuzuki-ku.

Private international schools:
German School Tokyo Yokohama

Post-secondary institutions:
Musashi Institute of Technology
Tokyo City University

Local attractions
Yokohama History Museum

Noted people from Tsuzuki
Reiko Nakamura, Olympic swimmer
Yuya Tegoshi, musician

References
 Kato, Yuzo. Yokohama Past and Present. Yokohama City University (1990).

External links
Tsuzuki Ward Office
City of Yokohama statistics

Wards of Yokohama